Tatsiana Uvarova (born 25 July 1985) is a former professional Belarusian tennis player.

Her career-high WTA rankings are 222 in singles and 201 in doubles, both achieved in 2005. In her career, Uvarova won two singles and two doubles titles on the ITF Women's Circuit.

Playing for Belarus Fed Cup team, she has a win–loss record of 3–1.

Tatsiana Uvarova retired from tennis before the 2007 season.

ITF Circuit finals

Singles: 4 (2–2)

Doubles: 5 (2–3)

Fed Cup participation

Singles

External links
 
 

1985 births
Living people
Belarusian female tennis players
21st-century Belarusian women